Terflavin B is an ellagitannin, a type of hydrolysable tannin. It can be found in Myrobalanus chebula (Terminalia chebula), the black chebulic, and in Terminalia catappa, the Indian almond.

It is formed from a nonahydroxytriphenic acid dilactone and a gallic acid linked to a glucose molecules.

References 

Ellagitannins